Nibbs is a surname of French and Old English and German origin and may refer to:

Stanley Nibbs (1914-1985) teacher and preacher from the British Virgin Islands.
Arthur Nibbs Antigua and Barbuda politician
Richard Henry Nibbs (1816–1893) English painter and book illustrator 

English-language surnames